The fifth Inter-Cities Fairs Cup was played over the 1962–63 season. There were five representative teams for some major European cities, four of which lost out in the first round. Valencia defeated Dinamo Zagreb over two legs to defend their title.

First round

|}

1 Barcelona progressed to the Second round after winning a play-off match 3–2.

First leg

Second leg

Sampdoria won 3–0 on aggregate.

Petrolul Ploiești won 5–0 on aggregate.

Drumcondra won 6-4 on aggregate.

Dunfermline won 2–1 on aggregate.

Roma won 13–3 on aggregate.

Second round

|}

1 Petrolul Ploiești progressed to the Quarter finals after winning a play-off match 1–0.

2 Dinamo Zagreb progressed to the Quarter finals after winning a play-off match 3–2.

3 Valencia progressed to the Quarter finals after winning a play-off match 1–0.

4 Red Star Belgrade progressed to the Quarter finals after winning a play-off match 1–0.

First leg

Second leg

Leipzig XI 1–1 Petrolul Ploiești on aggregate.

Bayern Munich won 6–1 on aggregate.

Ferencváros won 6–1 on aggregate.

Aggregate 6–6

Roma's Giulio Corsini was injured in the 85th minute and had to leave the pitch as substitutions were not yet allowed.

Roma won 5–4 on aggregate.

Play-off

Quarter-finals

|}

First leg

 

Hibernian

Second leg

Ferencváros won 2–1 on aggregate.
 

Roma won 3–2 on aggregate.

Semi-finals

|}

First leg

Second leg

Valencia won 3–1 on aggregate.

Final

First leg

Second leg

External links
 Inter-Cities Fairs Cup results at Rec.Sport.Soccer Statistics Foundation

2
Inter-Cities Fairs Cup seasons